This is a list of members from the Jammu and Kashmir Legislative Council when it was dissolved in 2019. The state elects 36 members for the term of 6 years. 22 members were indirectly elected by the state legislators, 2 members were elected from Local Authorities constituencies, 4 from Panchayat constituencies. The Governor of Jammu and Kashmir nominated the other 8 members. from among eminent people of various fields.

List of all Members of Legislative Council of Jammu and Kashmir State 

Keys:

Elected by Members of Jammu and Kashmir Legislative Assembly (22)

Elected by Urban Local Bodies & Rural Local Bodies Members (6)

Nominated Members (8)

References

 
Legislative Council
Lists of state legislators of Indian States